John Holmes Jenkins III  (1940–April 16, 1989) was an American historian, antiquarian bookseller, publisher, and poker player.

Career
Jenkins published his first book Recollections of Early Texas History the year he graduated from high school. He went on to become a well-known dealer in antiquarian books and documents, primarily of Texas history. Unlike many booksellers, he read much of what he bought and sold, resulting in his ten-volume Papers of the Texas Revolution. His Jenkins Publishing Company, including the Pemberton Press for trade publishing and the San Felipe Press for private publishing, produced more than 300 titles.

Jenkins was elected a fellow of the Texas State Historical Association in 1967.

In 1971, Jenkins was instrumental in helping the FBI recover an extremely valuable portfolio of original colored engravings, John James Audubon's Birds of America, stolen from Union College in Schenectady, New York. Jenkins's accounts of this experience, the purchase of the Eberstadt collection, and other lively reminiscences appear in his book Audubon and Other Capers, published in 1976. That same year, he received an honorary doctor of letters degree from Union College for his role in recovering the Audubon portfolio, as well as for his contributions to historical scholarship and the book trade. In 1980, Jenkins was elected president of the Antiquarian Booksellers' Association of America. In this capacity, he worked as principal organizer of a national system for identifying and publicizing the theft or loss of rare books and other valuable materials from libraries, booksellers, and private collections, and for seeing that the thieves are arrested and prosecuted.

Jenkins became a champion poker player in Las Vegas, Nevada, where he was known as "Austin Squatty" because of his habit of sitting cross-legged. He finished in 7th place at the 1983 World Series of Poker main event, earning $21,600, and two months before his death he won first place in Las Vegas at Amarillo Slim's No Limit Hold-em, earning $99,050.

Death
Jenkins was killed on April 16, 1989, by a shot to the back of his head, near Bastrop, Texas, while doing field research as part of his work on a biography of Edward Burleson, which was published posthumously, coauthored and completed by Kenneth Kesselus, a Texas historian and first cousin of Jenkins. Although shot in the back of the head, the sheriff declared it a suicide, claiming he somehow disposed of the gun which was never found.

See also
List of unsolved murders

References

Sources
 Austin American-Statesman, April 23, 1989.
 Gregory Curtis, "Forgery Texas Style," Texas Monthly, March 1989.
 Dallas Morning News, April 18, 19, 28, 1989.
 John H. Jenkins Papers, Barker Texas History Center, University of Texas at Austin.
 Otho Plummer, "John H. Jenkins: Bookseller," Texana 3 (Fall 1965).

External links
 
Calvin Trillin, "Knowing Johnny Jenkins" from New Yorker October 1989
Antiquarian Bookseller's Association of America
Stanford University Libraries
Texas Observer
Center for American History, University of Texas
John Jenkins 'Austin Squatty' Tournament Results

1940 births
1989 deaths
1989 murders in the United States
20th-century American businesspeople
20th-century American historians
20th-century American male writers
20th-century publishers (people)
American booksellers
American murder victims
American poker players
American publishers (people)
Antiquarian booksellers
Deaths by firearm in Texas
Male murder victims
People from Beaumont, Texas
People murdered in Texas
Super Bowl of Poker event winners
Unsolved murders in the United States
Historians from Texas
American male non-fiction writers
Historians of Texas